David Samuel Pike (March 23, 1938 – October 3, 2015) was an American jazz vibraphone and marimba player. He appeared on many albums by Nick Brignola, Paul Bley and Kenny Clarke, Bill Evans, and Herbie Mann. He also recorded extensively as leader, including a number of albums on MPS Records.

Biography
He learned drums at the age of eight and was self-taught on vibraphone. Pike made his recording debut with the Paul Bley Quartet in 1958. He began putting an amplifier on his vibes, when working with flautist Herbie Mann in the early-1960s. By the late-1960s, Pike's music became more exploratory, contributing a unique voice and new contexts that pushed the envelope in times remembered for their exploratory nature. The Doors of Perception, released in 1970 for the Atlantic Records subsidiary Vortex Records, and produced by former boss Herbie Mann, explored ballads, modal territory, musique concrète, with free and lyrical improvisation, and included musicians including alto saxophonist Lee Konitz, bassist Chuck Israels and pianist Don Friedman.

Pike moved to Europe and signed with MPS Records. With the collaboration of Volker Kriegel (guitar), J. A. Rettenbacher (acoustic and electric bass), and Peter Baumeister (drums), he formed the Dave Pike Set. The group recorded six records from 1969-1972 that ran the gamut from funky grooves to free, textural territory. The group, though short-lived, created a unique identity and textural palette. Kriegel's compositional and instrumental (playing acoustic, classical, and electric guitar as well as sitar) contributions to the group helped set the Dave Pike Set's sound apart, organically incorporating influences from jazz, soul jazz, psychedelia, avant-garde music, and world music.

He died in Del Mar, California of emphysema, aged 77.

Discography

As leader 
 It's Time for Dave Pike (Riverside, 1961)
 Pike's Peak (Epic, 1962) – recorded in 1961
 Bossa Nova Carnival (New Jazz, 1962)
 Limbo Carnival (New Jazz, 1962)
 Dave Pike Plays the Jazz Version of Oliver! (Moodsville, 1963) – recorded in 1962
 Manhattan Latin (Decca, 1964)
 Jazz for the Jet Set (Atlantic, 1966) – recorded in 1965
 Got the Feelin (Relax, 1969)
 Four Reasons (MPS, 1969)
 Noisy Silence/Gentle Noise (MPS, 1969)
 Live at the Philharmonie (MPS, 1970)
 Infra-Red (MPS, 1970)
 The Doors of Perception (Vortex, 1970) – live recorded in 1966
 Album (MPS/BASF, 1971)
 Salomao (MPS/BASF, 1972)
 Times Out of Mind (Muse, 1976)
 On a Gentle Note (Muse, 1978)
 Let the Minstrels Play On (Muse, 1980)
 Moon Bird (Muse, 1983)
 Pike's Groove (Criss Cross, 1986)
 Bluebird (Timeless, 1989)
 Bophead (Ubiquity, 1998)
 Peligroso (CuBop, 2000)
 At Studio 2 (B.Free, 2016)

As sideman 
With Herbie Mann
 Brazil, Bossa Nova & Blues (United Artists, 1962)
 Herbie Mann Returns to the Village Gate (Atlantic, 1963)
 Herbie Mann Live at Newport (Atlantic, 1963) – live
 My Kinda Groove (Atlantic, 1965) – recorded in 1964
 Latin Mann (Columbia, 1965)
 Standing Ovation at Newport (Atlantic, 1965) – live
 The Roar of the Greasepaint the Smell of the Crowd (Atlantic, 1965)
 Monday Night at the Village Gate (Atlantic, 1966) – recorded in 1965
 Today! (Atlantic, 1966) – recorded in 1965
 The Evolution of Mann (Atlantic, 1972)[2LP] – compilations

With others
 Paul Bley, Solemn Meditation (GNP, 1957)
 Nick Brignola, All Business (Reservoir, 1999)
 Kenny Clarke/Francy Boland Big Band, All Smiles (MPS, 1968)
 Slide Hampton, Mellow-dy (LRC, 1992)
 The Jazz Couriers, Gene Norman Presents the Jazz Couriers (Whippet, 1957)
 Babatunde Olatunji, High Life! (Columbia, 1963)
 Clark Terry, At the Montreux Jazz Festival (Polydor, 1970)

References

External links
 Obituary Los Angeles Times
 Interview with Dave Pike National Association of Music Merchants Oral History Program (2007)

1938 births
2015 deaths
American jazz vibraphonists
American marimbists
Musicians from Detroit
Ubiquity Records artists
Muse Records artists
Riverside Records artists
Jazz musicians from Michigan
Criss Cross Jazz artists